ASC Socogim is a Mauritanean football club based in Sebkha.

Achievements

Mauritanean Premier League: 3

2000, 2004

Football clubs in Mauritania
1948 establishments in Mauritania